Krasimir Genchev Balakov (born 29 March 1966) is a Bulgarian professional football manager and former player who last served as the head coach of Bulgarian club CSKA 1948. A former attacking midfielder, he was a key member of the Bulgaria national team that finished fourth in the 1994 FIFA World Cup. He is considered as second only to Hristo Stoichkov among Bulgarian footballers of his generation.

Club career
Balakov began his club career at the local Etar Veliko Tarnovo, before transferring to Portugal's Sporting Clube de Portugal in 1990, playing alongside future Ballon D'Or recipient Luís Figo, his compatriot Yordanov, and future two-time Champions League winner Paulo Sousa. Though Sporting Clube de Portugal had a quality squad, Balakov only managed to win the 1994–95 Portuguese Cup during his time at the club. In 1995, he transferred to Germany's VfB Stuttgart where he won two UEFA Intertoto Cups (2000 and 2002) and a DFB-Pokal (1997), before retiring in 2003 - the same year that he called time on an international career which had spanned 15 years and 92 caps. As an attacking midfielder Balakov formed a successful attacking partnership with strikers Fredi Bobic and Giovane Élber at Stuttgart. The trio were known as the "magic triangle". He stayed at Stuttgart until retiring as a player in 2003, although he did make a comeback as a player two years later when he made a single appearance as player-manager of VFC Plauen.

Coaching career
The year after he retired, Krasimir became assistant coach of the club he had just retired from, VfB Stuttgart. He stayed in this position for two years before deciding to become a player-manager at VFC Plauen, where he remained for just a short time.

He had been appointed on 16 January 2006 as a manager of Grasshopper Club Zürich to replace Hanspeter Latour who left for 1. FC Köln. Balakov managed to win the Intertoto Cup, thus qualified the club to the UEFA Cup for 2006–07 season.

He had been appointed on 29 October 2007 as a manager of FC St. Gallen to replace Rolf Fringer. Three days before the season ended, he was fired by the club management.

In December 2008, he became manager of PFC Chernomorets Burgas in his homeland, taking over from Dimitar Dimitrov, after also having considered an offer to coach the national team of his country. On 6 December 2010, he was released from PFC Chernomorets Burgas after mutual consent, following a change in the long-term vision for the club by the owner Mitko Sabev.

On 27 May 2011, it was announced that Balakov would take over the helm of Croatian club Hajduk Split.

On 22 March 2012, Balakov was appointed the manager of 1. FC Kaiserslautern. He was sacked on 17 May 2012, after being unable to prevent Kaiserslautern's relegation to the 2. Bundesliga. He subsequently continued his career as manager in his country.

On 4 January 2018, he was announced as the new manager of Etar Veliko Tarnovo with Stanislav Genchev, Iliyan Kiryakov and Kaloyan Chakarov as first team coaches.

On 14 May 2019, he was named as the new manager of the Bulgaria national team.

In October 2019, Balakov was replaced as manager of the national team by Georgi Dermendzhiev after resigning from his role following the backlash over his denial of alleged fan racism aimed at members of the England team in a Euro 2020 qualifying match as well as a continued string of unsatisfactory results. He took over as manager of CSKA 1948 in June 2020. In late August 2020, Balakov's duties were extended to cover the organizational management as well, with assistant Yordan Yurukov becoming more actively involved in the training process. However, the latter resigned on 22 September, leaving Balakov to be the sole one in charge of the team. In June 2021, Balakov parted ways with CSKA 1948, with the club's management thanking him for establishing the team among the stronger sides in the top division of Bulgarian football.

International career
Balakov made 92 appearances for Bulgaria, between 1988 and 2003 (one of the best totals in national history) and scored 16 goals. He made his debut on 2 November 1988, in the 1–1 draw with Denmark in a qualifying match for the 1990 FIFA World Cup, coming on as a late second half substitute for Hristo Stoichkov. Other than the 1994 FIFA World Cup, he also played for his country at Euro 1996 and the 1998 FIFA World Cup. At age 37 he played in the qualifications for Euro 2004 to help his teammates qualify but retired from football before the final stage in Portugal.

International goals
Scores and results list Bulgaria's goal tally first, score column indicates score after each Balakov goal.

Managerial statistics

Honours
Etar Veliko Tarnovo
A Group: 1990–91

Sporting CP
 Portuguese Cup: 1995

VfB Stuttgart
 DFB-Pokal: 1996–97
 UEFA Intertoto Cup: 2000, 2002
 DFB-Ligapokal finalist: 1997, 1998
 UEFA Cup Winners' Cup finalist: 1997–98
 Bundesliga runner-up: 2002–03

Bulgaria
 FIFA World Cup fourth place: 1994

Individual
 FIFA World Cup All-Star Team: 1994
 Bulgarian Footballer of the Year: 1995, 1997
kicker Bundesliga Team of the Season: 1995–96, 1996–97, 1997–98
 FIFA XI (Reserve): 1996

References

External links

1966 births
Living people
People from Veliko Tarnovo
Association football midfielders
Bulgarian football managers
Bulgarian expatriate football managers
Bulgarian footballers
Bulgarian expatriate footballers
Bulgaria international footballers
Bulgaria youth international footballers
1994 FIFA World Cup players
1998 FIFA World Cup players
FC Etar Veliko Tarnovo players
Sporting CP footballers
UEFA Euro 1996 players
VfB Stuttgart players
Bulgarian expatriate sportspeople in Germany
First Professional Football League (Bulgaria) players
Bundesliga players
Primeira Liga players
Grasshopper Club Zürich managers
FC St. Gallen managers
HNK Hajduk Split managers
1. FC Kaiserslautern managers
Expatriate football managers in Switzerland
Bulgarian expatriate sportspeople in Portugal
2. Bundesliga managers
Expatriate football managers in Germany
PSFC Chernomorets Burgas managers
VFC Plauen players
FC CSKA 1948 Sofia managers
Sportspeople from Veliko Tarnovo Province